Mepivacaine  is a local anesthetic of the amide type.  Mepivacaine has a reasonably rapid onset (more rapid than that of procaine) and medium duration of action (shorter than that of procaine) and is marketed under various trade names including Carbocaine and Polocaine.

Mepivacaine became available in the United States in the 1960s.

Mepivacaine is used in any infiltration and local anesthesia.

It is supplied as the hydrochloride salt of the racemate, which consists of R(-)-mepivacaine and S(+)-mepivacaine in equal proportions. These two enantiomers have markedly different pharmacokinetic properties.

Mepivacaine was originally synthesized in Sweden at the laboratory of Bofors Nobelkrut in 1956.

References

External links
Mepivacaine at RxList

Local anesthetics
Piperidines
Anilides
AstraZeneca brands